Masanobu (written: , , , , , , ,  or ) is a masculine Japanese given name. Notable people with the name include:

, Japanese kugyō
, Japanese painter
, Japanese samurai
, Japanese daimyō
, Japanese print designer, book publisher and painter
, Japanese daimyō
, Japanese military leader
, Japanese farmer and philosopher
, Japanese sumo wrestler
Masanobu Shinozuka (born 1930), Japanese engineer
, Japanese film director
, Japanese footballer
, Japanese sport shooter
, Japanese rower
, Japanese video game designer
, Japanese professional wrestler
, Japanese karateka
, Japanese golfer
 (born 1966) Japanese actor
, Japanese footballer
, Japanese actor

Japanese masculine given names